A list of films produced in the Philippines in the 1940s. For an A-Z listing see:
:Category:Philippine films

Note that due to the Philippines involvement in World War II, film production between 1942 and 1945 was at a stand still.

1940

1941–1949

References

External links
Filipino film at the Internet Movie Database

1940s
Films
Philippines